Richard Edward Tee (born Richard Edward Ten Ryk; November 24, 1943 – July 21, 1993) was an American pianist, studio musician, singer and arranger, who had several hundred studio credits and played on such notable hits as "In Your Eyes", "Slip Slidin' Away", "Just the Two of Us", "I'll Be Sweeter Tomorrow (Than I Was Today)", "Crackerbox Palace", "Tell Her About It", "Don't Give Up" and many others.

Biography
Tee was born in Brooklyn, New York  to Edward James Ten Ryk (1886–1963), who was from Guyana, and Helen G. Ford Skeete Ten Ryk (1902–2000), of New York.  Tee spent most of his life in Brooklyn and lived with his mother in a brownstone apartment building.

Tee graduated from The High School of Music & Art in New York City and attended the Manhattan School of Music. Though better known as a studio and session musician, Tee led a jazz ensemble, the Richard Tee Committee, and was a founding member of the band Stuff. In 1981, he played the piano and Fender Rhodes for Simon and Garfunkel's Concert in Central Park.

Tee played with a diverse range of artists during his career, including Paul Simon, Carly Simon, The Bee Gees, Barbra Streisand, Roberta Flack, Aretha Franklin, Diane Schuur, Donny Hathaway, Peter Allen, George Harrison, Diana Ross, Duane Allman, Quincy Jones, Bill Withers, Art Garfunkel, Nina Simone, Juice Newton, Billy Joel, Etta James, Grover Washington Jr., Eric Clapton, Kenny Loggins, Patti Austin, David Ruffin, Lou Rawls, Ron Carter, Peter Gabriel, George Benson, Joe Cocker, Chuck Mangione, Pino Daniele , Tim Finn, Peabo Bryson, Mariah Carey, Chaka Khan, Phoebe Snow, Doc Severinsen, Leo Sayer, Herbie Mann and countless others. He also contributed to numerous gold and platinum albums during his long career and joined Stuff led by bassist Gordon Edwards. Other members of the band included guitarist Cornell Dupree, drummer Chris Parker, and later guitarist Eric Gale and drummer Steve Gadd.

After a 16-year relationship with Eleana Steinberg Tee of Greenwich, Connecticut, the couple were married in Woodstock, New York, by New York State Supreme Court Justice Bruce Wright. The couple moved to the Chelsea Hotel in 1988, and later to Cold Spring, New York.

Tee died on July 21, 1993, in Calvary Hospital (Bronx) aged 49, after suffering from prostate cancer. He was survived by his mother Helen Ten Ryk of Brooklyn, six sons, and two stepdaughters. He is buried in the Artist Cemetery in Woodstock, New York.

Equipment
Tee used a diverse range of keyboards during his recording and touring career, notably the Hammond organ, piano, Hohner clavinet and synthesizers. His trademark sound, however, was his unique method of playing a Fender Rhodes electric piano and feeding the signal through an Electro-Harmonix Small Stone effect pedal phase shifter.

Discography

As leader
 Strokin'  (Tappan Zee/Columbia, 1979)
 Natural Ingredients (Tappan Zee, 1980)
 The Bottom Line (Electric Bird, 1985)
 Inside You (Epic/Sony, 1989)
 Real Time (One Voice, 1992)
 The Right Stuff (P-Vine, 1993)
 Real Time Live in Concert 1992 (Videoarts, 2012)

As guest
With George Benson
 Tell It Like It Is (1969)
 Give Me the Night (1980)
 In Your Eyes (1983)
 Big Boss Band (1990) with the Count Basie Orchestra
 Love Remembers (1993)

With Hank Crawford
 It's a Funky Thing to Do (Cotillion, 1971)
 Help Me Make it Through the Night (Kudu, 1972)
 We Got a Good Thing Going (Kudu, 1972)
 Wildflower (Kudu, 1973)
 Hank Crawford's Back (Kudu, 1976)

With Cornell Dupree
 Teasin'  (1974)
 Coast to Coast (1988)
 Can't Get Through (1991)
 Child's Play (1992)
 Uncle Funky (1992)

With Steve Gadd
 Gadd About (1984)
 The Gadd Gang (1986)
 Here & Now (1988)
 Live at the Bottom Line (1988)
 Gadd Gang (1991)

With Stuff 
 Stuff (1976)
 More Stuff (1977)
 Stuff It (1978)
 Live Stuff (1978)
 Live in New York (1980)	
 East (1981)
 Best Stuff (1981)
 Stuff Live in Montreux (2008)

With Grover Washington Jr.
 Inner City Blues (1971)
 All the King's Horses (1972)
 Soul Box – Vol. 1 & Vol. 2 (1973)
 Feels So Good (1975)	
 Winelight (1980)
 Skylarkin' (1980)
 Come Morning (1981)
 The Best Is Yet to Come (1982)
 In Concert (1982)
 Inside Moves (1984)
 A House Full of Love (1986)

With others
 Tune In, Turn On (1967) Benny Golson
 Soul Drums (1968) Bernard Purdie
 Soul Rebel (1968) Bob Marley
 I Heard That (1969) Quincy Jones
 Shirley Scott & the Soul Saxes (1969) Shirley Scott
 Lena & Gabor (1969) Lena Horne and Gábor Szabó
 Good Vibes (1969) Gary Burton
 Cornucopia (1969) Dizzy Gillespie
 Comment (1970) Les McCann
 Live at Freddie Jett's Pied Piper (1970) Esther Phillips
 Everybody's Talkin'  (1970) King Curtis
 Suite 16 (1970) Yusef Lateef	
 Boys from Dayton (1971) Snooky Young
 Blacknuss (1971) Rahsaan Roland Kirk
 Salt Song (1971) Stanley Turrentine
 Quiet Fire (1971) Roberta Flack
 Push Push (1971) Herbie Mann
 Young, Gifted and Black (1972) Aretha Franklin	
 Chuck Rainey Coalition (1972) Chuck Rainey
 Sweet Buns & Barbeque (1972) Houston Person
 Soul Is... Pretty Purdie (1972) Bernard Purdie
 Alone Again (Naturally) (1972) Esther Phillips
 The Final Comedown (1972) Grant Green
 Sweet Buns & Barbeque (1972) Houston Person
 The Weapon (1973) David Newman
 Blues Farm (1973) Ron Carter
 Don't Mess with Mister T. (1973) Stanley Turrentine
 Abandoned Luncheonette (1973) Daryl Hall & John Oates
 In the Beginning (1974) Hubert Laws
 I Can Stand a Little Rain (1974) Joe Cocker
 Let Me in Your Life (1974) Aretha Franklin
 Your Baby Is a Lady (1974) Jackie DeShannon
 With Everything I Feel in Me (1974) Aretha Franklin
 Continental American (1974) Peter Allen
 AWB (1974) Average White Band
 Journey (1974) Arif Mardin
 The Disco Kid (1975) Van McCoy
 Anything Goes (1975) Ron Carter
 Feel Like Makin' Love (1975) Roberta Flack
 Negril (1975) Eric Gale
 Still Crazy After All These Years (1975) Paul Simon
 Sneakin' Sally Through the Alley (1975) Robert Palmer
 Jamaica Say You Will (1975) Joe Cocker
 The New York Connection (1975) Tom Scott
 Lost Generation (1975) Elliott Murphy
 Thirty Three & 1/3 (1976) George Harrison
 The Case of the 3 Sided Dream in Audio Color (1976) Rahsaan Roland Kirk
 Second Childhood (1976) Phoebe Snow
 Dinner Music (1976) Carla Bley
 Stingray (1976) Joe Cocker
 End of a Rainbow (1976) Patti Austin
 The Real McCoy (1976) Van McCoy
 Endless Flight (1976) Leo Sayer
 Native New Yorker (1977) Odyssey
 Firefly (1977) Jeremy Steig
 Roots (1977) Quincy Jones
 Havana Candy (1977) Patti Austin
 Cissy Houston (1977) Cissy Houston
 Never Letting Go (1977) Phoebe Snow
 Watermark (1977) Art Garfunkel
 Lady Put the Light Out (1977) Frankie Valli
 Celebrate Me Home (1977) Kenny Loggins
 The Stranger (1977) Billy Joel
 Ringo the 4th (1977) Ringo Starr
 The Atlantic Family Live in Montreaux (1977)
 Multiplication (1978) Eric Gale
 Phonogenic – Not Just Another Pretty Face (1978) Melanie
 It Begins Again (1978) Dusty Springfield
 Don't Cry Out Loud (1978) Melissa Manchester
 Luxury You Can Afford (1978) Joe Cocker
 Boys in the Trees (1978) Carly Simon
 Deep in the Night (1978) Etta James
 Intimate Strangers (1978) Tom Scott
 Cheryl Lynn (1978) Cheryl Lynn
 Queen of the Night (1978) Loleatta Holloway
 Against the Grain (1978) Phoebe Snow
 Chaka (1978) Chaka Khan
 Warmer Communications (1978) Average White Band
 Scratch My Back (1979) David "Fathead" Newman
 Prisoner (1979) Cher
 Spy (1979) Carly Simon
 In Love (1979) Cheryl Lynn
 La Diva (1979) Aretha Franklin
 I Could Have Been a Sailor (1979) Peter Allen
 Fate for Breakfast (1979) Art Garfunkel
 Syreeta (1980) Syreeta Wright
 Connections (1980) Richie Havens
 Aretha (1980) Aretha Franklin
 Guilty (1980) Barbra Streisand
 Love Sensation (1980) Loleatta Holloway
 What Cha' Gonna Do for Me (1981) Chaka Khan
 Apple Juice (1981) Tom Scott
 RIT (1981) Lee Ritenour
 Living Eyes (1981) Bee Gees
 Blade Runner (1982)
 Heartbreaker (1982) Dionne Warwick
 I'm the One (1982) Roberta Flack
 Tantalizingly Hot (1982) Stephanie Mills
 Quiet Lies (1982) Juice Newton
 Fill Up The Night (1983) Sadao Watanabe
 Hearts and Bones (1983) Paul Simon
 Escapade (1983) Tim Finn
 In My Life (1983) Patti Austin
 An Innocent Man (1983) Billy Joel
 Born to Love (1983) Peabo Bryson, Roberta Flack
 Merciless (1983) Stephanie Mills
 Universal Rhythm (1984) Ralph MacDonald
 Watching You Watching Me (1985) Bill Withers
 Ferryboat(1985) Pino Daniele
 "Underground" David Bowie (1986)
 So (1986) Peter Gabriel
 10th Avenue (1986) Patrick Williams New York Band on "Still Crazy After All These Years"
 Streamlines (1987) Tom Scott
 Get Close to My Love (1987) Jennifer Holliday
 Sound Investment (1987) Flip Phillips & Scott Hamilton
 Red Hot Rhythm & Blues (1987) Diana Ross
 At Home (1987) Janis Siegel
 The Camera Never Lies (1987) Michael Franks
 Close Up (1988) David Sanborn
 Talkin' 'Bout You (1988) Diane Schuur
 The Real Me (1988) Patti Austin
 Hot Water (1988) Jimmy Buffett
 At Last (1989) Lou Rawls
 Street Smarts (1989) Eddie Gomez
 Journeyman (1989) Eric Clapton
 Soul Provider (1989) Michael Bolton
 Midnight in San Juan (1989) Earl Klugh
 Bottom's Up (1989) Victor Bailey
 Mariah Carey (1990) Mariah Carey
 Leap of Faith (1991) Kenny Loggins
 Star Time (1991) James Brown
 Upfront (1992) David Sanborn
 Am I Not Your Girl? (1992) Sinéad O'Connor
 I'll Take Care of You (1992) Cissy Houston, Chuck Jackson
 Evolution of Herbie Mann (1993) Herbie Mann
 Black Tie White Noise (1993) David Bowie
 Friends Can Be Lovers (1993) Dionne Warwick
 Don't Look Back (1993) Al Green
 Skyline (1993) Phil Carmen

References

External links

 “My Life On The Wild Side of The Music Business”–Part Two, Chapter Two: Ha! As A Kid, I Beat Richard Ten-Ryk in Handball! By Winston Munford

1943 births
1993 deaths
Musicians from Brooklyn
American session musicians
Deaths from prostate cancer
American jazz pianists
Deaths from cancer in New York (state)
American rhythm and blues keyboardists
American soul keyboardists
American funk keyboardists
African-American jazz pianists
American jazz keyboardists
20th-century African-American male singers
20th-century American singers
20th-century American pianists
The High School of Music & Art alumni
American organists
American male organists
Jazz musicians from New York (state)
American male pianists
American male jazz musicians
Stuff (band) members
20th-century American keyboardists
20th-century American male singers
American people of Guyanese descent